"Living in a Box" is a song by British band Living in a Box, released on 23 March 1987 as their first single from their debut album album of the same name. It was the group's biggest hit single along with "Room in Your Heart" (1989), reaching  5 on the UK Singles Chart. "Living in a Box" became the group's only top-40 hit in the United States, peaking at No. 17 on the Billboard Hot 100. The song was later covered by Bobby Womack; his version reached No. 70 in the UK.

Background

The song's title came from a comment by a friend of the band's songwriter and keyboard player Marcus Vere. The friend lived in a small council flat in Sheffield prompting him to remark "I feel like I'm living in a cardboard box!", referring to the sense of feeling enclosed. The video featured British DJ Tony Blackburn holding and moving the mouth of a cardboard cutout of himself over his face.

Track listings

Non-US 7-inch single
A. "Living in a Box" – 3:02
B. "Living in a Box" (The Penthouse mix) – 3:10

Non-US 12-inch single
A. "Living in a Box" (dance mix) – 6:10
AA. "Living in a Box" (The Penthouse mix) – 5:18

UK 12-inch single (The Bootleg mix)
A1. "Living in a Box" (The Bootleg mix) – 6:03
B1. "So the Story Goes" – 3:50
B2. "The Liam McCoy" – 3:01

UK CD single
 "Living in a Box" (dance mix) – 6:10
 "Living in a Box" (The Penthouse mix) – 5:18
 "Superheroes" – 3:57

US and Canadian 7-inch single
A. "Living in a Box" (single version) – 3:02
AA. "Living in a Box" (edited dance mix) – 3:50

US 12-inch single
A1. "Living in a Box" (dance mix) – 6:10
B1. "Living in a Box" (The Penthouse mix) – 5:18
B2. "Living in a Box" (edited dance mix) – 3:50

Charts

Weekly charts

Year-end charts

References

1987 debut singles
1987 songs
Chrysalis Records singles
Living in a Box songs